ATV Miss Asia Pageant is an annual Hong Kong-based beauty pageant organized and broadcast by Asia Television (ATV). Originating in 1985 as a local Hong Kong pageant, the contest went on hiatus from the 2000 through 2003, and was re-branded as an Asian pageant in 2004, with contestants spanning the continent of Asia. The pageant was ceased to exist in 2015 with the shutdown of its organizer, ATV.

In 2018, ATV announced that they are rebooting the pageant, after their transition from a terrestrial broadcast operation to an online media company. The pageant, which will be partnered with South Korean company CJ E&M, was reported by the media as "ATV's biggest investment of the year".

History

1985–2000: Beginnings as local pageant
With the success of the Miss Hong Kong Pageant by rival Hong Kong television station Television Broadcasts Limited (TVB), ATV started organizing Miss Asia Pageant in 1985, searching out Hong Kong's representative for Miss Asia Pacific International (then known as the Miss Asia Pacific Quest).  The pageant name was a bit of a misnomer back then as Miss Asia Pageant was actually named to match the name of organizer Asia Television Limited, and it was solely intended for local Hong Kong residents to enter.

In 1995, the pageant made history by removing age restrictions for delegates. That year, Aicardi Jiang (宮雪花), at the age of 47 years became the oldest delegate of Miss Asia, placing fifth in the pageant.  On the other end of the spectrum, On-Yuen To (陶安仁), was the youngest delegate at the age of 15 years.

In 2000, due to poor ratings and lack of sponsors, ATV announced that the pageant would go on hiatus until further notice.

2000–present: Post-hiatus and rebrands
In 2004, ATV rebooted the pageant and re-branded it as an event for not just Hong Kong, but also for the rest of Asia as contestants from other parts of Asia now participate, finally living up to its namesake as an Asia-wide pageant. However, the pageant is still very Chinese focused, with multiple representatives from Hong Kong, Taiwan and Mainland China, compared to one contestant from each of the rest of the countries.

As of 2011, Miss Asia Chinese Regional Competitions selects Chinese delegates in several regions: Hong Kong, Macau, Mainland China, Taiwan, Canada, and US.  Then, the top performers of these competitions come together for the ATV Miss Asia Pageant Greater China Finals, which also acts as the semi-finals of the ATV Miss Asia Pageant, selecting around 10 finalists (12 finalists are selected in 2013). These delegates are then joined by national pageant winners from other Asian countries to compete the crown of ATV Miss Asia at the Finals.

In 2011, the pageant name has been modified to ATV Miss Asia Pageant (ATV亞洲小姐競選), adding the organizer's name to the title, to distinguish it from other Asia-wide beauty pageants.

Whereas the pageant mirrored Miss Hong Kong Pageant pre-hiatus, the revived version more closely resembled the Miss Chinese International Pageant, which is also organized by rival television station, TVB.

In 2018, ATV rebooted the whole project after the company was transformed into an online media company.

Major award winners

1980s–1990s

2004–2014、2018–2019

Region rank by number of wins

Miss Asia showing at the International beauty stage

Miss World

Miss Asia Pacific

Other beauty pageants 

thumb

Miss Asia Canada Pageant 
Miss Asia Canada, previously known as ATV Miss Asia Toronto Pageant in 2006–2022, is an annual beauty pageant organized by ATV and RST Creative Studios that selects Toronto's representative(s) for the annual ATV Miss Asia Pageant that is held in Hong Kong. Despite ATV's cessation of terrestrial broadcasting in Hong Kong - and by extension, the end of the ATV and the ATV Miss Asia Pageant - Miss Asia Canada founded by Producer/Director Tony Jorge has registered as a National Pageant in Canada in 2015. In 2023 RST Creative Studios formed a new pageant organization called GEM Group (Global Entertainment Management Group) operating independently the future of the partnership remains unclear as ATV no longer has jurisdiction over their former franchisee, ATV has not yet secured a new long-term partnership with the new pageant organization know as GEM Group as the future of ATV remains unclear. Miss Asia Canada is currently partners with Miss Asia Global based in India, Miss Asia International based out of the USA, Miss Supertalent of the World based out of Korea, and Miss Cosmopolitan based out of Malaysia.

See also
Miss Hong Kong Pageant
Miss Chinese International Pageant
Miss Asia Pacific International
Mr. Asia Contest

References

External links
Official website

Beauty pageants in Hong Kong
1985 establishments in Hong Kong
International beauty pageants
Continental beauty pageants